Theodoros Lampiris (born 13 April 1997) is a Greek professional footballer who plays as a goalkeeper for Episkopi.

References

1997 births
Living people
Greek footballers
Football League (Greece) players
Super League Greece 2 players
Platanias F.C. players
Acharnaikos F.C. players
Apollon Larissa F.C. players
Doxa Drama F.C. players
Association football goalkeepers
Footballers from Kozani